Ronald Hurley Clark (born January 5, 1953) is a Senior United States district judge of the United States District Court for the Eastern District of Texas.

Biography
Born in Caripito, Venezuela, Clark received a Bachelor of Arts degree from the University of Connecticut in 1973 and a Master of Arts degree from the University of Connecticut in 1974.

He was an armor officer in the United States Army from 1974 to 1976, where he served at Fort Hood, Texas and Germany as a mortar platoon leader and tank company executive officer in 1st Battalion, 66th Armor Regiment, 2nd Armor Division. In 1979, he received a Juris Doctor from the University of Texas Law School in Austin. He was in the United States Army Reserve from 1980 to 1990, where he served in the 490th Civil Affairs Company in Abilene, Texas (1980–82) and the Individual Ready Reserve (1983–90). He reached the rank of captain.

Clark was an assistant city attorney in the City Attorney's Office of Abilene from 1979 to 1982- while working in the Public Defender's office his business card read: "Reasonable Doubt, at a Reasonable Price." He was in private practice in Texas from 1982 to 2002. From 1997 to 2002, while in Sherman in Grayson County, Clark served as a Republican member from District 62 in the Texas House of Representatives.

Federal judicial service
On January 23, 2002, Clark was nominated by President George W. Bush to a seat on the United States District Court for the Eastern District of Texas vacated by Howell Cobb. Clark was confirmed by the United States Senate on October 2, 2002, and received his commission on October 10, 2002. A brief controversy arose over Clark's stated intent to remain on the ballot for reelection to his Texas House seat, and to serve through the next legislative session before assuming his judgeship, but this delay proved uncomfortable for the Bush Administration, and ultimately did not materialize. Clark nonetheless won the most votes in the November election, declining the seat and leaving a vacancy to be filled in a later special election. Clark served as Chief Judge from January 1, 2015 to February 28, 2018. He assumed senior status on February 28, 2018.

References

External links

United States District Court Eastern District of Texas
Presidential Nomination: Ronald H. Clark

1953 births
Living people
Judges of the United States District Court for the Eastern District of Texas
United States district court judges appointed by George W. Bush
21st-century American judges
People from Abilene, Texas
People from Sherman, Texas
People from Beaumont, Texas
Republican Party members of the Texas House of Representatives
United States Army officers
University of Connecticut alumni
University of Texas School of Law alumni
21st-century American politicians